Fyfield is a village and civil parish in the Test Valley district of north west Hampshire, England. Its nearest town is Andover.

Part of Redenham Park lies within the parish.

References

Fyfield in the Victoria County History of Hampshire

External links

Villages in Hampshire